Courting Tragedy And Disaster is the second studio album by American heavy metal band Himsa. It was released on June 17, 2003.

Track listing 
"Dominion" - 3:16
"Rain To The Sound Of Panic" - 3:57
"A Girl In Glass" - 4:55
"Kiss Or Kill" - 4:17
"Jacob Shock" - 3:17
"Cherum" - 4:17
"It's Nights Like This That Keep Us Alive" - 3:06
"Loveless And Goodbye" - 4:46
"Scars In The Landscape" - 3:37
"Sense Of Passings" - 4:07
"When Midnight Breaks" - 3:58

Personnel 
 John Pettibone - Vocals
 Tim Mullen - Drums
 Kirby Charles Johnson - Guitar
 Sammi Curr - Guitar and Keys
 Derek Harn - Bass
 All words and music written by Himsa except tracks 4 and 5, written by Himsa and Brian Johnson
 Additional backing vocals by Brandan Schieppati, Aaron Edge, Shane Hellmuth and Ariel Lapidus
 Additional lead guitar on track 9 by (Metal Matt) Wicklund

Credits 
Produced and Engineered by Steve Carter
Recorded Winter 2002 at Robert Lang Studios and Orbit Audio - Seattle, WA
Mixed by Steve Carter and Himsa at Rainstorm Studio - Bellevue, WA
Mastered by Paul Speer at Rainstorm Studio - Bellevue, WA
Assistant Engineer: Justin Armstrong

Himsa albums
2003 albums